Litfin is a surname. Notable people with the surname include:

Ben Litfin (born 1995), Australian soccer player
Duane Litfin (born 1943), American academic administrator and evangelical minister
Günter Litfin (1937–1961), German tailor who became the second known person to die at the Berlin Wall